Honey Steel's Gold is the fifth solo album by Australian guitarist and songwriter Ed Kuepper recorded in 1991 and released on the Hot label. The album was re-released in 2000 with six bonus tracks, four from Kuepper's No Wonder EP, and early recordings of "The Way I Made You Feel" and "Everything I've Got Belongs To You".

Reception
The album spent 12 weeks in the Australian charts in 1992 peaking at number 28. Honey Steel's Gold was nominated for an ARIA for the Best Independent Release at the ARIA Music Awards of 1992.

Reviewed in Rolling Stone Australia at the time of release, it was said, "Much of this album seems to be about the conjuring of mood rather than unfolding songs in a narrative manner." The reviewer particularly noted the contribution of Chris Abrahams, and predicted the song "Everything I've Got Belongs to You" would be a hit if released as a single.

The Allmusic review by Ned Raggett awarded the album 4½ stars and states "Honey Steel's Gold is Kuepper in many ways at his most dramatic and expansive". In October 2010, it was listed in the top 50 in the book, 100 Best Australian Albums.

Track listing
All compositions by Ed Kuepper except as indicated
 "King of Vice" - 9:53
 "Everything I've Got Belongs to You" - 4:15
 "Friday's Blue Cheer/Libertines of Oxley" - 8:03
 "Honey Steel's Gold" - 5:23
 "The Way I Made You Feel" - 5:20
 "Not Too Soon" - 3:12
 "Closer" - 4:16
 "Summerfield" - 3:41
 "Indian Reservation" (John D. Loudermilk) - 3:10 Bonus track on CD reissue
 "Steamtrain" (Ray Davies) - 7:40 Bonus track on CD reissue
 "No Wonder Medley: No Wonder/Built for Comfort/Cypress Grove Blues" (Kuepper, Mark Dawson/Willie Dixon/Skip James) - 8:06 Bonus track on CD reissue
 "Milk Cow Blues" (Sleepy John Estes) - 2:08 Bonus track on CD reissue
 "The Way I Made You Feel 2" - 5:21 Bonus track on CD reissue
 "Everything I've Got Belongs to You 2" - 4:16 Bonus track on CD reissue  
Recorded at Electric Avenue, Sydney, Australia in Winter 1991.

Charts

Personnel
Ed Kuepper - vocals, guitar
Mark Dawson - drums, percussion
Sir Alfonso -bass
Chris Abrahams - piano

References

Hot Records albums
Ed Kuepper albums
1991 albums